This is a list of winners and nominees of the Primetime Emmy Award for Outstanding Guest Actress in a Comedy Series. Prior to 1989, the category was not gender-specific, and, thus, was called Outstanding Guest Performer in a Comedy Series. It is given in honor to an actress who has delivered an outstanding performance in a guest-starring role in a television comedy series. The current recipient is Laurie Metcalf for Hacks. Since the category change in 1989, a total of 34 actresses were awarded for their performances. The most awarded actress is Cloris Leachman, with 3 wins, followed by Tina Fey, Colleen Dewhurst, Kathryn Joosten, Jean Smart, Tracey Ullman, Betty White, and Maya Rudolph, with 2 wins. These awards, like the other "Guest" awards, were previously not presented at the Primetime Emmy Award ceremony, but, rather, at the Creative Arts Emmy Award ceremony.

Winners and nominations

1970s

1980s

1990s

2000s

2010s

2020s

Performers with multiple wins

3 wins
 Cloris Leachman

2 wins
 Colleen Dewhurst
 Tina Fey
 Kathryn Joosten
 Maya Rudolph (consecutive)
 Jean Smart (consecutive)
 Tracey Ullman
 Betty White

Programs with multiple awards
7 awards
 Saturday Night Live (3 consecutive; 2 consecutive)

3 awards
 Frasier (2 consecutive)

2 awards
 Desperate Housewives
 Love & War (consecutive)
 Mad About You
 Malcolm in the Middle
 Murphy Brown

Performers with multiple nominations

8 nominations
 Cloris Leachman

7 nominations
 Tina Fey

6 nominations
 Maya Rudolph

5 nominations
 Christine Baranski
 Melissa McCarthy
 Laurie Metcalf
 Elaine Stritch
 Betty White

4 nominations
 Eileen Heckart
 Jane Lynch

3 nominations
 Elizabeth Banks
 Carol Burnett
 Georgia Engel
 Dot-Marie Jones
 Kathryn Joosten
 Wanda Sykes
 Kristen Wiig

2 nominations
 Jane Adams
 Christina Applegate
 Angela Bassett
 Kathy Bates
 Joan Cusack
 Blythe Danner
 Eileen Brennan
 Kristin Chenoweth
 Colleen Dewhurst
 Carrie Fisher
 Cyndi Lauper
 Shelley Long
 Bette Midler
 Bernadette Peters
 Susan Sarandon
 Molly Shannon
 Jean Smart
 Emma Thompson
 Tracey Ullman
 Nancy Walker

Programs with multiple nominations

23 nominations
 Saturday Night Live

11 nominations
 30 Rock

10 nominations
 Frasier

8 nominations
 Desperate Housewives
 Malcolm in the Middle

6 nominations
 Cheers
 The Cosby Show
 Glee
 The Golden Girls
 Will & Grace

5 nominations
 The Big Bang Theory
 Friends
 Hacks
 Murphy Brown

4 nominations
 Everybody Loves Raymond
 Mad About You

3 nominations
 Ally McBeal
 A Black Lady Sketch Show
 Black-ish
 The Good Place
 The Larry Sanders Show
 The Marvelous Mrs. Maisel
 Monk
 Orange Is the New Black
 3rd Rock from the Sun

2 nominations
 A Different World
 Ellen
 Fleabag
 Girls
 Grace Under Fire
 Louie
 Love & War
 Shameless
 Two and a Half Men
 Ugly Betty

References

Guest Actress - Comedy Series
Awards for actresses